Felicity Cloake is an English food writer. She writes for The Guardian newspaper and in New Statesman magazine.

Early life 
Felicity Cloake grew up in Hertfordshire; her father was a John Lewis executive and her mother taught French. She has Irish heritage on her maternal side. Cloake attended Rugby School before studying English at St Peter's College, Oxford. She began her writing career in the Oxford Student.

Writing 
Cloake is best known for her weekly How to cook the perfect column in The Guardian, starting in 2010, where she attempts to create the best possible version of a popular dish.

Online, television and radio 
She has also appeared on television as guest host on Great British Menu in 2015. In October 2020, Cloake hosted an online livestream event in conversation with food writer Grace Dent for The Guardian.

Books 

 Perfect, Fig Tree (2011)
 Perfect Host: 162 easy recipes for feeding people and having fun, Fig Tree (2013)
 Perfect Too, Fig Tree (2014)
 The A-Z of Eating: A Flavour Map for the Adventurous Cook, Fig Tree (2016)
 Completely Perfect, Penguin, (2018)
One More Croissant for the Road, Harper Collins (2019)
Red Sauce, Brown Sauce: A British Breakfast Odyssey, Harper Collins (2022)

Awards 

 New Media of the Year Award, Guild of Food Writers, 2011
 Food Journalist of the Year Award, Guild of Food Writers, 2011

References

External links 
 Official website
 Felicity Cloake, Penguin
 Felicity Cloake columns, New Statesman
 Felicity Cloake columns, The Guardian

Year of birth missing (living people)
Living people
English cuisine
English food writers
The Guardian journalists
English people of Irish descent
Alumni of St Peter's College, Oxford
People educated at Rugby School
Writers from Hertfordshire